Rudolph Moser (Rudi Moser) is the drummer for Einstürzende Neubauten as well as the last incarnation of Die Haut, which also included Einstürzende Neubauten guitarist Jochen Arbeit.

He also collaborated with Robert Rutman's Steel Cello Ensemble on the album Zuuhh!! Muttie Mum!.

Moser is also part of MoserMeyerDöring, an experimental band from Berlin who had a single called "Watching The Daybreak".

References

External links
 Official Einstürzende Neubauten website

Living people
Year of birth missing (living people)
German rock drummers
Male drummers
German male musicians
Einstürzende Neubauten members